Leader is a 2009 Sri Lankan Sinhala action thriller film directed by Ranjan Ramanayake and co-produced by Bevan Perera and P. Aruran. It stars Ranjan Ramanayake and Adeen Khan, along with Babu Antony, Robin Fernando and Anusha Damayanthi. Music composed by Suneth Kelum. Public Performance Board of Sri Lanka removed some controversial political parts of the film. Leader is the film in Sinhala cinema history that had been screened with the most number of copies with 50 film theaters.

Some of the political clips were removed from the film due to Public Performance Board (PPB). The film was screened free of charge for two weeks from February 27 and producer decided to direct Rs. 1 from each ticket sold in all the theaters to Ranaviru fund. In April 2009, producer donated one day's collection of the film in all 50 theaters to the construction of Jaffna Cultural Center.

It is adopted from 1994 Hong Kong Film The Bodyguard From Beijing.

Plot
 
Pooja is a daughter of a kind politician named Kadirgamar. Kadirgamar wins the election between with a gangster named Raguvaran. Raguvaran kills Kadirgamar in front of Pooja and threatens her.

Cast
 Ranjan Ramanayake as Leader
 Adeen Khan as Pooja (Voice By Anarkali Akarsha)
 Babu Antony as Raghuwaran / Kimbulawala Soththi Siran (Voice By Prasanna Fonseka)
 Sandun Wijesiri as Kadiragamar
 Rangana Premaratne as Marcus Bandaranayake
 Robin Fernando
 Anusha Damayanthi
 Janesh Silva as Jonee
 Chathura Perera as Ismail
 Anton Jude
 Ronnie Leitch
 Jeevan Handunnetti
 D.B. Gangodathenna
 Dasun Madushanka as Pooja's brother

Soundtrack
The songs were composed by Suneth Kalum. The song "Rata Rakaganna" is based on "Arjunar Villu" from Ghilli (2004).

References

2009 films
2000s Sinhala-language films